Kasepää was a rural municipality of Estonia, in Jõgeva County.

Villages 
Kaasiku, Kasepää, Kükita, Metsaküla, Nõmme, Omedu, Raja and Tiheda.

References

External links